The Diocese of West Missouri is a diocese of the Episcopal Church in the United States of America and a member of Province VII. It has jurisdiction over sixty counties in western Missouri running from the cities Fairfax in the north to Branson in the south and from Kansas City in the west to Fayette in the east. Its Cathedral and diocesan offices are located in downtown Kansas City. As of 2020 the diocese was made up of 47 parishes and congregations divided into 3 deaneries.

History 
The diocese traces its roots to the missionary work of Bishop Jackson Kemper who founded churches in the area between 1836 and 1845. In 1841 the churches in the state of Missouri were joined together in the newly founded Diocese of Missouri. Over time the diocese grew to over 90 congregations throughout the state and in 1886 the 50th diocesan convention of the Diocese of Missouri approved a plan to split the diocese in two. On October 15, 1889 The 36th General Convention of the Episcopal Church approved the motion presented by the Diocese of Missouri and the Diocese of West Missouri was born.

The new diocese, originally known as the diocese of Kansas City, was given jurisdiction over 60 counties in the western part of the state covering 36,720 square miles. On June 3, 1890 the new diocese elected its first bishop, The Rt. Rev. Edward Robert Atwill.  Under Atwill the diocese continued to grow and 9 new churches were founded. Bishop Atwill served the Diocese of West Missouri until his death on January 24, 1911. 

Following Atwill's death, the diocese elected the Rt. Rev. Sidney Catlin Partridge, the first bishop of Kyoto, as their second bishop. He was translated to the see of West Missouri and served as its bishop until his death on June 22, 1930 from lobar pneumonia. It was under Partridge's episcopate that Harry S. Truman married his wife Bess at Trinity Episcopal Church in Independence.

In 1930 the diocese elected The Rev. Robert Nelson Spencer to succeed Partridge. Spencer was consecrated a bishop on October 28, 1930. From Bishop Atwill's time the diocese had continued to grow and it was under Bishop Spencer in 1935 that Grace and Holy Trinity Church at 13th and Broadway was designated as the diocese's Cathedral Church. Spencer resigned his ministry as Bishop of West Missouri in 1949.

Spencer was followed as bishop by Edward Randolph Welles II who was elected as bishop on December 6, 1949 and consecrated for that role on April 19, 1950. Under Bishop Spencer the diocese continued to grow and 11 churches were founded between 1953 and 1972. Bishop Spencer resigned in 1972 and two years later took part in the ordination of the Philadelphia Eleven. 

After Welles retirement the diocese elected Arthur Anton Vogel, a professor at Nashotah House theological seminary, to be its fifth bishop. Vogel authored two books during his tenure as Bishop and delivered the invocation at the 1976 Republican National Convention which met in Kansas City. Vogel retired in 1989 and was succeeded by his Coadjutor, The Rt. Rev. John Clark Buchanan who served the diocese for ten years retiring in 1999. Under Buchanan two more churches were admitted to the diocese. 

Buchanan was followed on the diocesan seat by Barry Robert Howe who served as diocesan bishop until his retirement in 2011. Following Howe's retirement the diocesan convention elected the Rev. Martin Scott Field to serve as the 8th Bishop of West Missouri. Field was consecrated on March 6, 2011 by the Most Rev. Katherine Jefferts Schori. On April 8, 2021 following a mediation process outlined by the canons of the Episcopal Church it was announced that Bishop Field would resign his ministry as Bishop on Holy Cross Day, 2021 and that the diocese would begin the process of calling a Bishop Provisional.

On August 3, 2021 the Standing Committee of the diocese announced that their candidate for Bishop Provisional was the Rt. Rev. Diane Jardine Bruce, the 7th Bishop Suffragan of the Diocese of Los Angeles. On Saturday, November 6th, 2021, the Convention of the Diocese meeting at Grace and Holy Trinity Cathedral, Kansas City elected Diane Jardine Bruce as Bishop Provisional. She took up residence in the Diocese and began her ministry on December 1st, 2021. Bruce is the first woman to lead the diocese as its bishop. She was formally welcomed and seated in the diocesan Cathedra on the Feast of the Epiphany, 2022.

Bishops of West Missouri

Suffragan and Assisting Bishops 
 Robert R. Spears, Jr., Suffragan Bishop 1967-1970 (subsequently Bishop of the Episcopal Diocese of Rochester, 1970–1984)

Churches

Ministries 
The diocese sponsors and supports a number of ministries throughout its geographical boundaries. They include: 

 Saint Luke's Hospital of Kansas City  
 Bishop Spencer Place, Kansas City 
 Nourish KC 
 St. Luke's Nursing Center, Carthage 
 Bishop Kemper School for Ministry 
 Council of Churches of the Ozarks 
 St. Luke's Home Care and Hospice

See also

 List of Succession of Bishops for the Episcopal Church, USA

References

External links

Grace and Holy Trinity Cathedral website

West Missouri
Christianity in Missouri
Protestantism in Missouri
 
Religious organizations established in 1890
Anglican dioceses established in the 19th century
Religion in Kansas City, Missouri
Province 7 of the Episcopal Church (United States)